"The Aeroplanes at Brescia" (German: "") is a short story by Franz Kafka published, in slightly shortened form, in the newspaper Bohemia on 29 September 1909. It describes an airshow near the Italian city of  Brescia, which Kafka saw with two of his friends (Max and his brother Otto Brod) during their journey to Italy. Among other participants, they saw Louis Blériot, the aviator famous for the first flight across the English Channel. The story is lively and witty, as Kafka was fascinated by the airshow. It is also the first description of aeroplanes in German literature.

References

External links

Short stories by Franz Kafka
1909 short stories
Short stories about aviation